Jamal Abdelmaji Eisa Mohammed (born 25 August 1993) is a Sudanese-born runner competing internationally over 5,000 and 10,000 metres. Mohammed was one of 29 athletes across 12 disciplines who representing the refugee Olympic team at the 2020 Tokyo Olympics.

In 2003, when he was 10 years old, members of the Janjaweed militia came to burn down his village and killed 97 people, including his father.  In 2010 he fled the violence in Sudan’s war-ravaged Darfur region aged 17, and Mohammed spent three days crossing the Sinai Desert from Egypt to Israel on foot, where he was eventually granted refugee protection. He found employment in Tel-Aviv and joined a running club, The Alley Runners in 2014. finished 40th in his European Cross Country Champion Clubs Cup debut in 2017, 30th in 2018 and 22nd in the 2019 edition on 3 February in Albufeira, Portugal.

Competitions

References

External links
 
 jamal abdelmaji https://www.facebook.com/jamalabdelmaji on Facebook 

1993 births
Living people
Sudanese refugees
Immigrants to Israel
Athletes (track and field) at the 2020 Summer Olympics
Refugee Olympic Team at the 2020 Summer Olympics